Christina T. Lopez (born April 18, 1981), better known by her stage name T Lopez, is an American singer, speaker, TV host, producer and writer from Ontario, California. T Lopez was a former member of the Latina group Soluna.

As a solo artist, T Lopez signed a record label deal with Cash Money Records and Universal Republic Records.

Other ventures

Media appearances and film acting
Along with her Latina group Soluna they have won Mexico's Heraldo award for Best New Pop Artist's in 2002, and appeared on national television shows such as The Late Late Show with Craig Kilborn Show, Sabado Gigante, Despierta America, and Hoy. A television pilot was developed for the group under the production of Suzanne DePasse, in affiliation with Paramount Studios, the UPN network and Gramnet. The role of Josie written especially for T Lopez.

T Lopez also has served as a host of the Sí TV television program "The Drop", which highlights Latino culture in music and movies. She has guest starred in The Suite Life of Zack & Cody as Brandi Tipton, as well as CSI: Crime Scene Investigation, Charmed, Ghost Whisperer, Days of our Lives, The Brothers Garcia, Terriers, and South Of Nowhere. She has starred in independent films such as April Fools, 21 & A Wake Up, Hollywood Kills, and the mockumentary "The Boys & Girls Guide to Getting Down".

Filmography

References

External links
 T Lopez on Myspace
 
 

1981 births
Living people
21st-century American women singers
American soap opera actresses
American actresses of Mexican descent
American women pop singers
American women singer-songwriters
People from Ontario, California
Singer-songwriters from California
Cash Money Records artists
21st-century American singers